The Mono Aircraft Monoprep was an American light civil sporting monoplane of the late 1920s.

Development and operation
Mono Aircraft was founded in 1927 and their first design was the Monoprep high-wing sporting two-seat open cockpit monoplane. Eight Monopreps were built.

The improved Monoprep 218 followed the initial model in 1929, with a 3 ft (1 metre) shorter wingspan giving increased speed.  84 Monoprep 218s were built by 1930.  One long-nosed aircraft was used to test one of the two Lambert H-106 engines during 1930.

The sole surviving example of the Monoprep 218 NC179K was publicly displayed in airworthy condition in the Airpower Museum at Ottumwa Iowa. It has now changed into private hands and is under restoration to fly again.

Specifications (Monoprep 218)

References
Notes

Bibliography

External links

 Historical data on Mono Aircraft at aerofiles.com

1920s United States sport aircraft
1920s United States civil utility aircraft
High-wing aircraft
Single-engined tractor aircraft
Aircraft first flown in 1927